Jack Griffin served as Chief Executive Officer of the Tribune Publishing Company from April 14, 2014 to February 23, 2016. He currently serves as a senior advisor at investment banking firm DeSilva+Phillips.

Career
Griffin graduated from Boston College and the Yale School of Management. Griffin started his career as a reporter and editor for a family owned trade newspaper publisher. Griffin spent five years at the Magazine Group of the New York Times Company before joining Meredith Corporation in 1994.

Meredith Corporation

Griffin spent a dozen years at Meredith Corporation, publisher of magazines including Better Homes and Gardens, Ladies' Home Journal and Family Circle. As President of its National Media Group since 2004, he led a transformation of Meredith into a digitally enabled, diversified media and marketing company. From its print roots, Meredith became a major provider of marketing services through Meredith Integrated Marketing, of which Jack was the founding General Manager in 1996. During his tenure, Griffin oversaw numerous acquisitions of print and digital properties.

Empirical Media

Griffin co-founded Empirical Media, a New York-based consulting firm, in 2011. At the helm of Empirical, Griffin served as a consultant to Tribune Company, where he worked with management to oversee the reorganization of the publishing unit to cut costs and streamline operations in preparation for its spinoff.

Tribune Publishing Company

In July 2013, Tribune Company announced the decision to separate its publishing assets, including the Los Angeles Times, the Chicago Tribune and six other daily newspapers, from its broadcasting holdings into a stand-alone public company. In March 2014, Griffin was appointed Chief Executive Officer of Tribune Publishing. In September 2015 Tribune Publishing fired Los Angeles Times Publisher Austin Beutner after a year on the job. Beutner was replaced by Timothy E. Ryan, publisher of The Baltimore Sun, another Tribune Publishing property. Several days later, more than 50 Los Angeles civic leaders including Eli Broad and two former mayors wrote an open letter to Griffin urging the company to continue progress in improving local coverage made by Beutner and to retain local management of the paper.

In February 2016, three weeks after billionaire Michael Ferro Jr. became Tribune Publishing's largest shareholder, Griffin was replaced as CEO by Ferro ally Justin Dearborn.

Additional Work

Griffin previously served as CEO of Time Inc. where he was fired by the company after less than six months on the job. He also served as the Chairman the Magazine Publishers of America (MPA), the trade association for the consumer magazine industry. Griffin has also served as Chairman of the American Advertising Federation (AAF), and as a Director of the Interactive Advertising Bureau and the Audit Bureau of Circulations. Griffin was a Founding Director of Next Issue Media, a digital newsstand formed by a consortium of five leading publishers including Hearst Corporation, Conde Nast, News Corporation, Meredith Corporation and Time Inc. Griffin also worked at the Parade Division of Advance Publications (1999-2003), where he was President and Publisher of Parade Magazine. Additionally, Griffin served as Vice President of Marketing for the Meredith Television Broadcasting Group.

Boards and Other Activities

Griffin is currently a Director of the Yale Center for Consumer Insights. He is also on the Business Advisory Board of Propublica, the investigative news organization.

Awards and Honors

Griffin is the recipient of numerous honors and awards. He is a member of the AAF Advertising Hall of Achievement and received its Jack Avrett Award for industry and community service. He has also been recognized as Publishing Executive of the Year by Advertising Age.

References

External links
Jack Griffen biodata

Living people
American business executives
Boston College alumni
Year of birth missing (living people)